Evelyne Manchon (born May 31, 1963 in Paris) is a French sport shooter. She competed in pistol shooting events at the Summer Olympics in 1984, 1988, and 1992.

Olympic results

References

1963 births
Living people
ISSF pistol shooters
French female sport shooters
Shooters at the 1984 Summer Olympics
Shooters at the 1988 Summer Olympics
Shooters at the 1992 Summer Olympics
Olympic shooters of France
20th-century French women